The Mounteagle transmitting station is a broadcasting and telecommunications facility, situated close to the town of Fortrose, Scotland, in Highland. It is owned and operated by Arqiva.

Coverage
Coverage includes the areas around the Moray Firth, in the Highland region of Scotland, including up to Helmsdale in the north, Elgin to the east, Dingwall to the west and the northern shores of Loch Ness to the south. This also includes the city of Inverness.

History
The station was built in 1961 by the Independent Television Authority to bring ITV to North East Scotland for the first time. Inaugural broadcasts were from the ITV franchise holder for the area, Grampian Television. 405-line monochrome transmissions were on channel 12, Band III VHF. The station was also the first in the area to broadcast television using Band III.

When colour UHF television began in 1969, the nearby BBC owned station at Rosemarkie was chosen over Mounteagle to carry these broadcasts. Both the UHF and VHF services continued in tandem until 1985, when VHF television was discontinued in the UK. At this point, Mounteagle ceased broadcasting television services entirely.

In 1982 Mounteagle was chosen as the site of the first commercial radio broadcasts in northern Scotland, with Moray Firth Radio taking to the air on 23 February of that year.

In 1996 transmitters for Classic FM were added, and then later in 1997 Mounteagle began broadcasting television services again, when transmitters were installed for the launch of Channel 5. Digital switchover occurred in the Inverness area in October 2010, and at this point the Channel 5 service was discontinued, and now broadcasts digitally from the nearby Rosemarkie transmitter site.

More recently the station has become the first in the area to carry digital radio broadcasts, with the addition of transmitters for Digital One, BBC and Score Inverness.

Channels listed by frequency

Analogue radio (VHF FM)

Digital radio (DAB)

Analogue television

30 September 1961 - 3 January 1985

30 March 1997 - 20 October 2010

See also
List of masts
List of tallest buildings and structures in Great Britain
List of radio stations in the United Kingdom

References

External links
Entry for Mounteagle at The Transmission Gallery
Mounteagle Transmitter at thebigtower.com

Transmitter sites in Scotland
Black Isle